Saúl Asael Martínez Álvarez (born 29 January 1976) is a Honduran former football forward who last played for USA fourth tier-side Miami United.

Club career
Nicknamed Speedy, Saúl Martínez was born in Colón, Honduras. He started his career at Honduran second division side Melgar before moving abroad to play for American outfit Long Island Rough Riders. He was assigned to Major League Soccer team Miami Fusion in 1999. His first game in Liga Nacional was on 10 December 2000 with Olimpia against Broncos.

China
Martínez first attracted the attentions of Shanghai Shenhua when he scored four goals against Slovenia during the Lunar New Year Cup in Hong Kong in early 2002. Shenhua quickly signed him and afterwards, Martinez became one of the most important players in the Shenhua team. He would end up playing in Asia for five years, winning the 2003 Chinese league title with Shanghai Shenhua; that title was however taken away from the club in 2013 due to its part in a match-fixing scandal. He also won the 2003 Golden Boot Award with Shanghai.

In January 2008, Martínez joined Costa Rican side Herediano for three months after a move to F.C. Motagua did not materialise. He then had a couple of seasons at Marathón.

He made a remarkable return from retirement with Victoria in the 2010 Apertura season, topping the goalscoring charts at age 34 and ending the season as runner-up behind Jerry Bengtson with 11 goals. In July 2011 he returned for another spell at Marathón.

He retired from football at the end of 2011. In 2013, he returned to playing and joined compatriot Érick Vallecillo at newly formed Miami United of the National Premier Soccer League.

International career
Martínez made his debut for Honduras in a July 2001 friendly match against Ecuador, in which he immediately scored a goal, and has earned a total of 35 caps, scoring 16 goals. He has represented his country in 11 FIFA World Cup qualification matches and played at the 2007 and 2009 UNCAF Nations Cups His international breakthrough however came during the 2001 Copa América, when Honduras surprisingly ended third and Martínez scored both goals in the historic win over World Cup runners-up Brazil.

His final international was a January 2009 UNCAF Nations Cup match against Panama.

Personal life

Career statistics

Club

International

International goals

Honours
Nacional Montevideo 
Uruguayan Primera División: 2001, 2002

Shanghai Shenhua
Chinese Jia-A League: 2003 (revoked due to match-fixing scandal)

C.D. Marathón
Liga Nacional de Fútbol Profesional de Honduras: 2008–09 (Apertura)

References

External links
 
 
 

1976 births
Living people
People from Colón Department (Honduras)
Association football forwards
Honduran footballers
Honduras international footballers
2001 Copa América players
2003 UNCAF Nations Cup players
2007 UNCAF Nations Cup players
2009 UNCAF Nations Cup players
Long Island Rough Riders players
Miami Fusion players
C.D. Olimpia players
F.C. Motagua players
Club Nacional de Football players
Shanghai Shenhua F.C. players
Chinese Super League players
Omiya Ardija players
C.S. Herediano footballers
C.D. Marathón players
C.D. Victoria players
Major League Soccer players
Liga Nacional de Fútbol Profesional de Honduras players
J1 League players
National Premier Soccer League players
Honduran expatriate footballers
Honduran expatriate sportspeople in Japan
Honduran expatriate sportspeople in China
Expatriate soccer players in the United States
Expatriate footballers in Uruguay
Expatriate footballers in China
Expatriate footballers in Japan
Expatriate footballers in Costa Rica
Virginia Beach Mariners players
A-League (1995–2004) players
Honduran expatriate sportspeople in Uruguay
Honduran expatriate sportspeople in Costa Rica